Lesley Carhart aka hacks4pancakes is the principal incident responder and threat analyst at industrial cyber security company Dragos.

They were described as one of the top 10 influencers in cybersecurity in 2019 through to 2020 by GlobalData research.

They are involved with and comment on a broad range of cybersecurity topics including industrial control systems, the Solar Winds hack, ransomware attacks, smart device insecurity, remote working, multi-factor authentication, and the 2021 Microsoft Exchange Server data breach.

They are active in the information security community, offering career advice and involved in conferences, including organizing PancakesCon.

References

External links 
Personal site

People associated with computer security
Computer security specialists
People in information technology
Year of birth missing (living people)
Living people
InfoSec Twitter